Dallen is both a surname and a given name. Notable people with the name include:

Russ Dallen, British financial advisor, economist, journalist and writer
Dallen Bounds (1971–1999), American serial killer
Dallen Stanford (born 1979), American rugby union player and commentator